Cranberry glass or Gold Ruby glass is a red glass made by adding gold salts or  colloidal gold to molten glass.  Tin, in the form of stannous chloride, is sometimes added in tiny amounts as a reducing agent.  The glass is used primarily in expensive decorations.

Production 
Cranberry glass is made in craft production rather than in large quantities, due to the high cost of the gold.  The gold chloride is made by dissolving gold in a solution of nitric acid and hydrochloric acid (aqua regia).  The glass is typically hand blown or molded.  The finished, hardened glass is a type of colloid, a solid phase (gold) dispersed inside another solid phase (glass).

History 
 
The origins of cranberry glass making are unknown, but many historians believe a form of this glass was first made in the late Roman Empire. This is evidenced by the British Museum's collection Lycurgus Cup, a 4th-century Roman glass cage cup made of a dichroic glass, which shows a different colour depending on whether light is passing through it or reflecting from it; red (gold salts) when lit from behind and green (silver salts) when lit from in front. Kitab al-Asrar, an Arabic work attributed to Abu Bakr al-Razi contains  one of the earliest modern descriptions of the preparation of gold ruby glass.

The craft was then lost and rediscovered in the 17th century Bohemian period by either Johann Kunckel in Potsdam or by the Florentine glassmaker Antonio Neri. Neither of them knew the mechanism which yielded the colour, however. Chemist and winner of the 1925 Nobel Prize in Chemistry Richard Adolf Zsigmondy was able to understand and explain that small colloids of gold were responsible for the red colour.

The most famous period of cranberry glass production was in 19th century Britain during the Victorian Era.

Legend holds that cranberry glass was first discovered when a noble tossed a gold coin into a mixture of molten glass. This legend is almost certainly not true, as the gold must be dissolved in aqua regia before being added to the molten glass.

Cranberry glass creations were most popular as a table display, often holding candy or flowers.

Cranberry glass was also frequently used for wine glasses, decanters, and finger bowls. Cranberry glass was also well known for its use in "Mary Gregory" glass. This glass had a white enamel fired onto the glass in a design, usually with a romantic theme.

See also
 Purple of Cassius
 Heart of Glass, a 1976 film by Werner Herzog on the secret of ruby glass

References

External links

 
 
 

Glass art
Glass trademarks and brands
Glass compositions
Craft materials